Streptomyces albicerus is a bacterium species from the genus of Streptomyces which has been isolated from sediments from the Tailan River from Xinjiang in China.

See also 
 List of Streptomyces species

References 

albicerus
Bacteria described in 2020